Michael Davies may refer to:

Entertainment
 Michael Davies (television producer) (born 1966), British producer of television game shows in the United States
 Mike Davies (broadcaster) (born 1978), disc jockey
 Michael ffolkes (Michael Davies, 1925–1988), illustrator and cartoonist
 Dik Mik (Michael Davies, born 1943), British musician with the band Hawkwind

Sports
 Michael Davies (cricketer) (born 1976), English cricketer
 Michael Davies (ice hockey) (born 1986), American professional ice hockey player
 Mike Davies (rugby league), of the 1980s for Wales and Cardiff City
 Mike Davies (footballer) (born 1966), English former professional footballer
 Mike Davies (tennis) (1936–2015), British tennis player

Other
 Michael Davies (Catholic writer) (1936–2004), traditionalist Catholic writer
 Sir Michael Davies (parliamentary official), Clerk of the Parliaments 1997–2003
 Michael Davies (judge) (1921–2006), judge of the High Court of England and Wales
 Mike Davies (architect) (born 1942), architect
 Michael Llewelyn Davies (1900–1921), foster son of the author J.M. Barrie
 Michael Davies (priest), Irish Anglican priest

See also
 Davies
 Michael Davis (disambiguation)